James Robert 'Bob' Joyce (born 3 November 1936) is an Australian hurdler. He competed in the men's 110 metres hurdles at the 1956 Summer Olympics.

References

1936 births
Living people
Athletes (track and field) at the 1956 Summer Olympics
Australian male hurdlers
Olympic athletes of Australia
Place of birth missing (living people)